John Cleve Livingston (born May 24, 1947) is an American rower who competed in the 1968 Summer Olympics and in the 1972 Summer Olympics.

He was born in Los Angeles and is the older brother of Mike Livingston.

In 1968 he was a crew member of the American boat which finished sixth in the eight event.

Four years later he won the silver medal with the American boat in the 1972 eights competition.

He graduated from Harvard University.

References

External links
 

1947 births
Living people
Rowers at the 1968 Summer Olympics
Rowers at the 1972 Summer Olympics
Olympic silver medalists for the United States in rowing
American male rowers
Medalists at the 1972 Summer Olympics
Harvard University alumni
Pan American Games medalists in rowing
Pan American Games gold medalists for the United States
Rowers at the 1967 Pan American Games